The South Okanagan Events Centre is a 5,000-seat multi-purpose arena in Penticton, British Columbia, Canada. It is home to the Penticton Vees ice hockey team. The arena opened to the public in September 2008. Previously, the Vees played at Penticton Memorial Arena.

The centre hosted the 2018 Scotties Tournament of Hearts Canadian national women's curling championship from January 27 to February 4.

Young Stars Rookie Tournament
The centre is home to the Young Stars Rookie Tournament, which is an annual tournament featuring rookies and prospects from the Calgary Flames, Vancouver Canucks, Winnipeg Jets and Edmonton Oilers.

External links
Official website

Indoor arenas in British Columbia
Indoor ice hockey venues in Canada
Sports venues in British Columbia
Buildings and structures in Penticton
Sport in Penticton